John Deasy may refer to:

 John Deasy (Fine Gael politician) (born 1967), Irish Fine Gael politician, Teachta Dála (TD) for Waterford from 2002
 John Deasy (UK MP) (1856–1896), Irish nationalist politician, Member of Parliament (MP) 1884–1893
John Deasy (educator) (born 1961), American educator, former superintendent for Los Angeles Unified School District from 2011 to 2014